John II of Dreux (1265–1309), called John the Good, Count of Dreux and Braine, was the son of Robert IV of Dreux and Beatrice, Countess of Montfort.

Robert fought with Philip IV of France in his wars in Flanders, including the sieges of Veurne, Cassel, de Bergues and Lille in 1297. He was at the Battle of the Golden Spurs (fought near Cambrai), where the French forces under Robert II of Artois suffered an unexpected defeat. In 1304, he fought at the Battle of Mons-en-Pévèle and served at the siege of Lille. He was chosen as one of the French ambassadors who negotiated an end to the war.

John first married Jeanne of Montpensier (?–1308).

John then married Perrenelle of Sully in 1308. They had:
Robert,
John
Peter
Joan

References

Sources

Dreux, John II, Count of
Dreux, John II, Count of
Counts of Dreux
House of Dreux